Dylan Crowe (born 13 April 2001) is an English professional footballer who plays as a defender for National League club Torquay United.

Club career
Crowe joined Ipswich Town's academy at the age of 12. He signed as a full-time scholar in 2017. Crowe signed his first professional contract with Ipswich in July 2019, signing a three-year contract.

He made his debut on 10 November 2020 in a 2–0 EFL Trophy defeat to Crawley Town. 

Dylan signed for Leiston on loan.

Crowe was released by the club at the end of the 2021–22 season.

On 30 June 2022, following his release from Ipswich, Crowe signed for National League club Torquay United.

International career
He has represented England at under-15, under-16, under-17 and under-18 levels.

Career statistics

References

External links
 
 
 

Living people
2001 births
English footballers
Association football midfielders
Ipswich Town F.C. players
Leiston F.C. players
Torquay United F.C. players
England youth international footballers
Southern Football League players